Lisa Lazarus is a British model and actress.

Biography
Lazarus was born in Llanelli, Wales. Lazarus attended the University of Hertfordshire where she studied her degree in Diagnostic Radiography.

Filmography

References

External links 

Living people
Actresses from Swansea
Alumni of the University of Hertfordshire
Miss Universe 2008 contestants
Welsh television actresses
Welsh film actresses
Welsh female models
British television actresses
British film actresses
British female models
Welsh beauty pageant winners
Welsh expatriates in India
Actresses in Hindi cinema
Actresses in Tamil cinema
British expatriate actresses in India
European actresses in India
Actresses of European descent in Indian films
21st-century Welsh actresses
21st-century British actresses
Year of birth missing (living people)